"Make Believe" is the second single from singer Sibel Redžep, recorded by her on her 2008 album The Diving Belle. The song was released as a downloadable-only single in July 2008 and reached #56 on downloads alone after only one week. The song has been is connected to the Ronald McDonald foundation in Sweden where Sibel is an ambassador, the video for the song shows clips of disadvantaged children in graphic boxes around Sibel.

Chart positions

References 

2008 singles
English-language Swedish songs
Sibel Redžep songs
2008 songs
Warner Records singles
Songs written by Sibel Redžep